Özlüce is a village in the İnegöl district of Bursa Province in Turkey.

References

Villages in İnegöl District